The 2017–18 North Texas Mean Green men's basketball team represented the University of North Texas during the 2017–18 NCAA Division I men's basketball season. The Mean Green, led by first-year head coach Grant McCasland, played their home games at UNT Coliseum, nicknamed The Super Pit, in Denton, Texas, as members of Conference USA. They finished the season 20–18, 8–10 in C-USA play to finish in a tie for seventh place. They lost in the first round of the C-USA tournament to Louisiana Tech. They were invited to participate in the College Basketball Invitational where they defeated South Dakota, Mercer, and Jacksonville State to advance to the best-of-three finals series against San Francisco. After losing in game 1, they won games 2 and 3 to become CBI champions. They also had the biggest crowd since 2010 at 6,291.

Previous season 
The Mean Green finished the 2016–17 season 8–22, 2–16 in C-USA play to finish in last place. They failed to qualify for the C-USA tournament.

On March 5, 2017, the school fired head coach Tony Benford after five years without a winning season. On March 13, the school hired Arkansas State head coach Grant McCasland as head coach.

Departures

Incoming Transfers

Recruiting class of 2017

Roster

Schedule and results

|-
!colspan=9 style=| Non-conference regular season

|-
!colspan=12 style=| Conference USA regular season

|-
!colspan=9 style=| Conference USA tournament

|-
!colspan=9 style=| CBI

See also
2017–18 North Texas Mean Green women's basketball team

References

North Texas Mean Green men's basketball seasons
North Texas
North Texas
College Basketball Invitational championship seasons
North Texas Mean Green men's b
North Texas Mean Green men's b